Craspidaster is a monotypic genus of echinoderms belonging to the family Astropectinidae. The only species is Craspidaster hesperus.

The species is found in Malesia and Indian Ocean.

References

Astropectinidae
Asteroidea genera
Monotypic echinoderm genera